Radovan Cebalović (born ) is a Montenegrin volleyball player. Native of Nikšić, he began his career in local club Volley Star, where he still plays . He played for the Montenegro men's national volleyball team in 2015 and 2016 FIVB World Leagues.

References

1988 births
Living people
Montenegrin men's volleyball players
Place of birth missing (living people)